Kaseke is a surname. Notable people with the surname include:

Deus Kaseke (born 1994), Tanzanian football striker
Elson Kaseke (1967-2011), Zimbabwean lawyer
Noel Kaseke (born 1980), Zimbabwean football midfielder

Surnames of African origin